Allan Melvyn "Mel" Whinnen MBE (born 6 October 1942) is a former Australian rules footballer who played for the West Perth Football Club in the Western Australian National Football League (WANFL) from 1960 to 1977. Whinnen played 367 premiership games for West Perth, a WAFL record, playing in four premiership sides and finishing runner-up in the Sandover Medal on two occasions, as well as winning West Perth's best and fairest award, the Breckler Medal, on a record nine occasions.

He was inducted into the West Australian Football Hall of Fame in 2004.

Career
Playing mainly as a centreman, Whinnen established himself in West Perth's league team, winning the Breckler Medal in 1962 and 1964 as the club's best and fairest. He also finished second in the Sandover Medal in 1964, polling 22 votes to finish one vote behind Barry Cable, the winner. Whinnen made his state debut for Western Australia against the Victorian Football Association (VFA) in 1963. Whinnen won West Perth's best and fairest award in both 1967 and 1968, and again in 1970, 1971, 1972, 1973 and 1975. In total, Whinnen won the Breckler Medal a record nine times between 1962 and 1975. 

Whinnen again played in premierships in 1969, 1971 and 1975. Whinnen was appointed as captain of West Perth for the 1977 season, and retired at the end of the year. 

Whinnen's 367 career premiership games is both a West Perth club record and a WAFL record as of 2022, and also remained a record in West Australian elite football until it was broken by David Mundy in Round 17 of the 2021 AFL season.

Other matches
Whinnen also played 14 interstate and carnival football matches for Western Australia, and four pre-season/night series matches for West Perth (these are counted as senior by the WAFL, but not the VFL/AFL). If these are included, Whinnen played a total of 385 senior career games.

Whinnen's total career senior games remained a West Australian elite football record until it was broken, depending on the viewpoint taken:
 Using the VFL/AFL's totals, by David Mundy in Round 12 of 2022.
 Including VFL/AFL pre-season/night series matches but excluding International Rules matches, by Mundy in Round 13 of 2021, having been equalled by Matthew Pavlich in Round 23 of 2016 (also his last game).
 Including International Rules matches, by Pavlich in Round 21 of 2016, and subsequently by Mundy in Round 10 of 2021.

Honours and awards
Whinnen was made a Member of the Order of the British Empire (MBE) in June 1976, for "services to sport", along with former teammate Bill Dempsey. In October 2000, he was named in the centre in West Perth's Team of the Century. Whinnen was an inaugural inductee of the West Australian Football Hall of Fame in March 2004. One of the entrance gates at Subiaco Oval is named after Whinnen, and a grandstand at Arena Joondalup, West Perth's home ground since 1994, is named the Whinnen–Dempsey Stand in honour of the two players' contribution to the club. Since 1998, the Mel Whinnen Medal has been awarded to the player judged best on ground in the grand final of the WAFL's colts (under-19) competition. Notable winners have included Paul Hasleby, Scott Stevens, Jacob Surjan and Matthew Leuenberger.

References

External links
Allan Melvyn (Mel) Whinnen player profile page at WAFLFootyFacts

1942 births
Living people
Australian rules footballers from Perth, Western Australia
West Perth Football Club players
West Australian Football Hall of Fame inductees
Australian Members of the Order of the British Empire
Australian Football Hall of Fame inductees